Alexandr Vasiliev (born May 16, 1989) is a Russian professional ice hockey winger who currently plays with HC Donbass in the Ukrainian Hockey League (UHL). He has formerly played in the Kontinental Hockey League (KHL).

References

External links 

1989 births
Living people
Atlant Moscow Oblast players
HC Donbass players
HC Vityaz players
HC Spartak Moscow players
KRS Heilongjiang players
Metallurg Novokuznetsk players
People from Elektrostal
Russian ice hockey right wingers
Torpedo Nizhny Novgorod players
Sportspeople from Moscow Oblast